Savignia bureensis is a species of sheet weaver found in Russia. It was described by Tanasevitch & Trilikauskas in 2006.

References

Linyphiidae
Spiders described in 2006
Spiders of Russia